The 2017 Cambridgeshire County Council election was held on 4 May 2017 as part of the 2017 local elections in the United Kingdom. All 61 councillors were elected from 59 electoral divisions, which returned either one or two county councillors each by first-past-the-post voting for a four-year term of office.

Boundary changes to the electoral divisions took effect at this election after a review of the county by the Local Government Boundary Commission for England, reducing the number of county councillors from 69 to 61, and the number of electoral divisions from 60 to 59.

The election took place on the same day as the first direct mayoral election for the newly created Cambridgeshire and Peterborough Combined Authority.

The Conservative Party won a majority on the council, while the UK Independence Party lost all their seats.

Previous composition

2013 election

Composition of council seats before election

Changes between elections

In between the 2017 election and the 2021 election, the following council seats changed hands:

Results summary

|}

Election of Group Leaders

Steve Count (March North & Waldersey) was reelected leader of the Conservative Group, Lucy Nethsingha (Newnham) was reelected leader of the Liberal Democratic Group, and Joan Whitehead (Abbey) was elected leader of the Labour Group. In late 2019 Elisa Meschini (King's Hedges) replaced Whitehead as Labour leader

Election of Leader of the Council

Steve Count the leader of the Conservative group was duly elected leader of the council and formed a Conservative administration.

Results by district
All electoral divisions elected one councillor unless stated otherwise.

Cambridge (12 seats)

District Summary

Division Results

East Cambridgeshire (8 seats)

District Summary

Division Results

Fenland (9 seats)

District Summary

Division Results

Huntingdonshire (17 seats)

District Summary

Division Results

South Cambridgeshire (15 seats)

District Summary

Division Results

References

2017
2017 English local elections
2010s in Cambridgeshire